Fallait pas !... is a French comedy film directed by Gérard Jugnot, released in 1996.

Plot 
The CHRO of a company, Bernard Leroy comes back from a team building organized by his company, and has to join the mansion of his future in-laws, where his parents, parents-in-law and fiancée wait for him : his wedding is the following day. But a car accident on a mountain road forces him to ask for help in a chalet, which reveals being the landmark of a sect where the guru, Magic, is about to eliminate the members.

Prisoner of the chalet, Bernard leads in his escape Sébastien, an adept fearful man, and arrives to steal the guru's car just before the explosives reduce the chalet into ashes. The problem is that the car also contains a briefcase containing 2 million dollars that should have been given to the doctor Simpson, a very wealthy and well-known psychiatrist. The guru and his accountant run after the two fugitives while on their side, Bernard and Sébastien temporarily find a refuge at the hotel after having attempted to prevent the police. Having not arrived to find the fugitives, Magic and Solomouka randomly find the invitation to Bernard's wedding and decode to go to the mansion to wait for him, and even take his family in hostage.

Bernard's fiancée, Constance, already troubled during the evening by the excentricity of Bernard's "parents", who are actually two actors that he has engaged, is not fooled of the behaviour of the two people. Asking them for additional explications, she is hypnotized by Magic and deeply falls asleep. Meanwhile, the henchmen of the doctor Simpson who run after Sébastien after a rough confrontation with Magic arrive in the hotel room, take both men in hostage and take them in a remote mountain corner. Bernard escapes with the help of Sébastien who steals the car of the two men and picks him up before having an accident a few metres further. In a race against the time to bring back the briefcase before the mansion is dynamited with all its occupants, the two fugitives finally reach the mansion and are controlled by the guru and his accountant.

While everything seems lost and the guru is about to trigger the fatal explosion, inside his car, it is finally the car that exploses to everyone's surprise. A few moments later, Sébastien explains himself, pretexting the repentance to his guru, he discreetley stole the detonator and placed it in his coat, filled with explosives.

Filming locations 
The shooting took place in spring 1996 in Isère and Savoie in Val d'Isère, Villaroger, Sainte-Foy-Tarentaise, Montmélian, Challes-les-Eaux, Saint-Alban-Leysse and at the Château du Touvet.

Cast 
 Gérard Jugnot as Bernard Leroy
 François Morel as Sébastien Coulibœuf
 Michèle Laroque as Constance
 Martin Lamotte as Aimé Solomuka
 Jean Yanne as Magic
 Micheline Presle as Bernard's "mother"
 Claude Piéplu as Bernard's "father"
 Sophie Desmarets as Constance's mother
 Jacques Jouanneau as Constance's father
 Thierry Lhermitte as Dr. Simpson
 Annie Grégorio as Thérèse
 Marine Mazéas as Gwenaëlle
 Bruno Slagmulder as Constance's brother
 Maurice Illouz as a gendarme
 Bonnafet Tarbouriech as a gendarme
 Philippe Sturbelle as a gendarme
 Éric Prat as a gendarme
 Jean-François Chaintron as Bernard's boss
 Hubert Saint-Macary : as Bernard's co-worker
 Philippe Béglia as the hotel owner
 Pascal Elbé as the gas station employee
 Pierre Chevallier as the bus driver
 David Douillet as Tcherno, henchman of Dr. Simpson
 Maxime Leroux as a henchman of Dr. Simpson

External links 

1996 films
1990s French-language films
French comedy films
1996 comedy films
Films directed by Gérard Jugnot
1990s French films